Canon (Colonel) John Glennie Greig (24 October 1871 – 24 May 1958) was an English soldier, cricketer and Roman Catholic priest who played most of his cricket in India.

Life and career
Born in Mhow near Indore in 1871, Greig lived in India until 1921. In his time, he was the finest batsman to play for the Europeans in the annual Bombay Presidency (later Pentangular) tournaments. He possessed a slight physique but strong wrists and was a useful right arm slow bowler. In India, he was affectionately called "Jungly" Greig. He was promoted to captain 19 November 1901, and later became Aide-de-camp to the Governor of Bombay.

Greig made his first-class cricket debut for the Europeans against the Parsees in the Bombay Presidency match of 1893/4. In the next year, he carried his bat for 79 runs out of 190 against the same opponents. His 184 five years later was the highest ever individual score made in India and in 1898 in Poona, he took 13 for 58 against the Parsees.

Against the touring Oxford Authentics in 1902 he scored 204, the first double hundred made on Indian soil. In December 1915 in a match styled India v England, he hit 216 which resulted in a win of an innings and 263 runs for England. Greig served as a selector when the All India side was chosen for their first official tour to England in 1911.

At Hampshire, he was a player, secretary and the president. He first represented them in 1901 when he was on leave from the army. The highest of his ten Hampshire hundreds was 249 not out against Lancashire at Liverpool in 1901. He began the 1905 season with a century in each innings against Worcestershire and 66 against the Australians. But he was injured midway through his innings of 187 in the return match against Worcestershire and played little cricket thereafter in the season. With 804 runs at 50.25, he finished fifth in the batting averages.

His last game for Hampshire was in 1921 when he became the secretary of the county cricket club. He served in that position till 1930 and became the President in 1945 and 1946.

Greig came to India as a captain in the army. By the time he returned he had become a colonel. He later became a Roman Catholic and was ordained as a priest in 1935. In 1947, he was made an honorary canon of the diocese of Portsmouth. Cricket historian Vasant Raiji considers his contributions to Indian cricket as of a same class as that of Ranji to English cricket.

References 
Vasant Raiji, India's Hambledon Men
Mihir Bose, A History of Indian Cricket, 1990 edition
Wisden Obituary

External links 

Indian cricketers
Hampshire cricketers
Gentlemen cricketers
Marylebone Cricket Club cricketers
Europeans cricketers
Mumbai cricketers
1958 deaths
1871 births
A. J. Webbe's XI cricketers
British Army officers